William Alexander Glassford (6 June 1886 – 30 July 1958) was a United States Naval officer with the rank of vice admiral, who is most noted for his service during World War II.

Early Naval Career

William Alexander Glassford was born on 6 June 1886, in San Francisco, California. His father William A. Glassford (1853–1931) was a career Army officer who retired as a colonel.  His brother, Pelham D. Glassford, was an Army officer who attained the rank of brigadier general.  Glassford attended the United States Naval Academy at Annapolis, Maryland and graduated on February 12, 1906. He was given the rank of Passed midshipman and ordered for sea duty aboard destroyer USS Preble. He spent next two years at sea, as was required by law at the time, then received his commission as an ensign.

World War II

Glassford commanded naval forces of the United States Asiatic Fleet during the first month of World War II, and then relocated to Java in the Netherlands East Indies to combine his forces with the American-British-Dutch-Australian Command ("ABDA"). His most notable battle was the Naval Battle of Balikpapan, in which he led a U.S. task force in an attack against Japanese forces that had occupied the port of Balikpapan on Borneo. The attack came too late to prevent the capture of Balikpapan, and had little effect on the Japanese campaign to capture the resources of the Netherlands East Indies.

After the campaign, Glassford returned to the United States where he held a variety of positions in the 6th Naval District and the Eighth Fleet.

Glassford died on 30 July 1958 and was buried at Arlington National Cemetery in Arlington, Virginia.

Decorations

Vice Admiral William A. Glassford's ribbon bar:

Notes

References
  U.S. Navy Combat Narrative, The Java Sea Campaign.
  Official Chronology of the U.S. Navy in World War II, Appendix I

1886 births
1958 deaths
United States Navy vice admirals
United States Naval Academy alumni
United States Navy personnel of World War I
United States Navy World War II admirals
Burials at Arlington National Cemetery
Recipients of the Navy Distinguished Service Medal